Pseudonupserha is a genus of longhorn beetles of the subfamily Lamiinae, containing the following species:

 Pseudonupserha congoensis Breuning, 1950
 Pseudonupserha flavipennis Breuning, 1967
 Pseudonupserha mediovittata Breuning, 1950
 Pseudonupserha neavei Aurivillius, 1914
 Pseudonupserha wittei Breuning, 1953

References

Saperdini